Nicholas "Nick" Alexander (born 24 August 1988) is an American former ski jumper. who competed in the 2010 and 2014 Winter Olympics as a member of Team USA

Career

Early years 
He was born in Brattleboro, Vermont and lives in Lebanon, New Hampshire. Alexander learned to ski and ski jump from members of the Lebanon Outing Club at the Storrs Hill Ski area. He made his world cup debut in Kuusamo in 2009. He is a member of the U.S. Men's Ski Jumping Team and he is an Olympian who competed in the 2010 Winter Olympics.

U.S. Nationals 
Alexander won the 2013 Men's U.S. National Ski Jumping Championship in Lake Placid, NY on the normal Olympic hill. He was second that same year in 2013 in the Men's U.S. National Ski Jumping Championship in Park City, UT on the large Olympic hill. He also won the 2009 Men's U.S. National Ski Jumping Championship in Lake Placid, NY, on the only hill jumped that year, the normal Olympic hill.

2010 season 
His best winter World Cup finish was 38th in the large hill event in March 2010 in Finland.

Alexander finished tenth in the team flying hill event at the FIS Ski Flying World Championships 2010 in Planica. He qualified in 29th place for the individual competition at this same event. He set his personal best 184 metres (604 ft) in this event.

At the 2010 Winter Olympics, he finished 11th in the team large hill, 40th in the individual large hill, and 41st in the individual normal hill events.

World Cup

Standings

Individual starts (21)

References

External links 
 

1988 births
Living people
American male ski jumpers
Olympic ski jumpers of the United States
Ski jumpers at the 2010 Winter Olympics
Ski jumpers at the 2014 Winter Olympics
People from Lebanon, New Hampshire